Union Church (Kipton Community Church) is a historic church at 511 Church Street in Kipton, Ohio.

It was built in 1879 and added to the National Register in 1982.

References

Churches on the National Register of Historic Places in Ohio
Gothic Revival church buildings in Ohio
Churches completed in 1879
Churches in Lorain County, Ohio
National Register of Historic Places in Lorain County, Ohio